I Changed a Lot is the eighth studio album by American DJ and producer DJ Khaled. It was released on October 23, 2015, by We the Best Music Group and RED Distribution. Recording sessions took place during 2014 to 2015, with its production by Khaled, along with The Beat Bully, Lee on the Beats, Danja, Bkorn and The Mekanics, as well as guest appearances from Future, Rick Ross, Boosie Badazz, Jeezy, Chris Brown, August Alsina, Fetty Wap, Yo Gotti, Trick Daddy,  French Montana, Meek Mill, Beanie Sigel, Jadakiss, Lil Wayne, Big Sean, Trey Songz, Jeremih, Ace Hood, Vado, Jay-Z, Mavado, John Legend, Usher and Fabolous.

I Changed a Lot was supported by four official singles: "They Don't Love You No More", featuring Jay-Z, Meek Mill, Rick Ross and French Montana, "Hold You Down", featuring Chris Brown, August Alsina, Future and Jeremih, "How Many Times", featuring Chris Brown, Lil Wayne and Big Sean and "Gold Slugs", featuring Chris Brown, August Alsina and Fetty Wap.

Singles
The lead single, titled "They Don't Love You No More", featuring Jay-Z, Meek Mill, Rick Ross and French Montana, was officially released on April 29, 2014. It was produced by Mike Zombie and co-produced by DJ Khaled. The music video for "They Don't Love You No More", featuring Jay-Z, Meek Mill, Rick Ross and French Montana (directed by Gil Green and Khaled), premiered on June 22, 2014.

The second single, titled "Hold You Down", featuring Chris Brown, August Alsina, Future and Jeremih, was released on August 10, 2014. It was produced by Lee on the Beats, Bkorn and LDB, and co-produced by Khaled. The music video for "Hold You Down", featuring Chris Brown, August Alsina, Future and Jeremih (directed by Gil Green), premiered on August 11, 2014.

The music video for "How Many Times", featuring Chris Brown, Lil Wayne and Big Sean. The song was produced by OZ, Bkorn and Lee on the Beats, and co-produced by Khaled. It was released on May 11, 2015. The song was officially released on May 12, 2015, as the album's third single.

The album's fourth single, "Gold Slugs", featuring Chris Brown, August Alsina and Fetty Wap, was released on October 12, 2015. It was produced by Lee on the Beats. The music video for "Gold Slugs", featuring Chris Brown, August Alsina and Fetty Wap, was also released on October 12, 2015.

Critical reception

I Changed a Lot was met with generally positive reviews from music critics. Marcus Dowling of HipHopDX said, "I Changed A Lot lacks a “We Taking Over”-style smash single to show for the incredible hit-making power of the performers present. Something just feels off in Khaled's traditional manner of creating ubiquitous pop cultural touchstones. This album is generally solid, but in lacking the groundbreaking moment we’ve come to expect from the artist/producer/chicken wing restaurateur known for being “the best,” it falls short."

Commercial performance
The album debuted at number 12 on the Billboard 200, with 25,000 equivalent album units in the United States, with 19,000 copies sold in its first week.

Track listing

Notes
 signifies a co-producer.

Charts

Weekly charts

Year-end charts

References

2015 albums
DJ Khaled albums
Republic Records albums
Albums produced by Danja (record producer)
Albums produced by DJ Khaled
Albums produced by Scott Storch